Triors Abbey is a Benedictine monastery located in Châtillon-Saint-Jean in the Drôme, Rhône-Alpes, France.

It was founded in 1984 as a priory of Fontgombault Abbey in an 18th-century château bequeathed to the monks for that purpose. Major building took place from 1990. Triors was raised to the status of an independent abbey in 1994. The first abbot was Dom Hervé Courau, who continues in the post. The community, as of 2008, numbers about 40.

It is part of the Solesmes Congregation of the Benedictine Confederation and as such focusses on Gregorian chant. As of 2008, plans are in hand to produce commercial recordings of Gregorian chants covering the entire liturgical year.

The liturgy is celebrated according to the extraordinary form of the Roman Rite (Tridentine Mass).

References

Sources 
Official site of the Abbey of Our Lady of Triors
 Abbayes provençales: Triors 

Benedictine monasteries in France
Christian organizations established in 1984
Buildings and structures in Drôme
20th-century Christian monasteries
Churches in Drôme
1984 establishments in France
Communities using the Tridentine Mass